Wes Lyons (born September 12, 1988) is a former American football wide receiver. He played college football at West Virginia. Lyons graduated from Woodland Hills High School and is one of the many successful players from Woodland Hills to reach the NFL.

Professional career

Spokane Shock
After going undrafted in the 2010 NFL Draft, Lyons signed with the Spokane Shock of the Arena Football League on September 24, 2010.

Pittsburgh Steelers
While still under contract with the Shock, Lyons was signed to a two-year contract with the Pittsburgh Steelers on February 15, 2011. Lyons played in all four of the Steelers' preseason games and caught 3 passes for 63 yards. He also caught an eleven-yard touchdown, which was called back due to a holding call. Despite being the third leading wide receiver, he was released on September 2, 2011.

He again signed with the Steelers on March 21, 2012, this time as a tight end. He was once again released on July 12, 2012.

Pittsburgh Power
Lyons was signed by the Pittsburgh Power on April 16, 2013. Lyons spent the entire season on the Injured Reserve.

Author Work
Lyons published his first book in 2012 titled "The Pursuit With Patience" about his life and football experiences.

References

External links
West Virginia Mountaineers bio
Pittsburgh Steelers bio
NFL.com bio
ESPN.com bio

1988 births
Living people
Players of American football from Pittsburgh
American football wide receivers
West Virginia Mountaineers football players
Pittsburgh Steelers players
Spokane Shock players